Robert Story may refer to:

Robert Story (poet) (1795–1860), English poet
Robert Story (minister) (1790–1859), Scottish minister
Robert Herbert Story (1835–1907), Scottish minister
Robert Story (politician) (born 1952), American politician
Robert Story (botanist) (1913–1999), South African botanist

See also
Robert Storey (disambiguation)